Songs from Ally McBeal is a soundtrack album by American singer Vonda Shepard, featuring music from the American television series Ally McBeal. It was released on May 5, 1998, by 550 Music and Sony Music Soundtrax. The album consists mostly of cover versions of songs from the 1960s, aside from four original songs, including the series' theme song, "Searchin' My Soul", which originally appeared on Shepard's 1992 album The Radical Light.

The album topped the charts in Australia, New Zealand, Norway, Spain, and Sweden, while reaching number three in the United Kingdom and number seven in both the United States and Canada.

Track listing
All tracks are produced by Vonda Shepard, except tracks 6 and 14, produced by Shepard and Michael Landau.

Charts and certifications 

|+Certifications for Songs from Ally McBeal

References

1998 soundtrack albums
550 Music albums
Ally McBeal
Sony Music soundtracks
Television soundtracks
Vonda Shepard soundtracks